Thabani Scara Kamusoko (born 2 March 1988) is a Zimbabwean footballer who plays for Zambia Super League club ZESCO United. He was formerly with Young Africans in Tanzania.

International
He made his Zimbabwe national football team debut on 11 February 2009 in a friendly against Tanzania.

He was selected for the 2019 Africa Cup of Nations squad.

References

External links
 
 
 Thabani Kamusoko at Footballdatabase

1988 births
Living people
Zimbabwean footballers
Zimbabwean expatriate footballers
Zimbabwe international footballers
Association football midfielders
Njube Sundowns F.C. players
Dynamos F.C. players
F.C. Platinum players
Young Africans S.C. players
ZESCO United F.C. players
Zimbabwe Premier Soccer League players
Zimbabwean expatriate sportspeople in Tanzania
Zimbabwean expatriate sportspeople in Zambia
Expatriate footballers in Tanzania
Expatriate footballers in Zambia
2019 Africa Cup of Nations players
2021 Africa Cup of Nations players
Tanzanian Premier League players